In July 2017, the International Union for Conservation of Nature (IUCN) listed 343 endangered insect species. Of all evaluated insect species, 5.7% are listed as endangered. 
The IUCN also lists 21 insect subspecies as endangered.

No subpopulations of insects have been evaluated by the IUCN.

For a species to be considered endangered by the IUCN it must meet certain quantitative criteria which are designed to classify taxa facing "a very high risk of extinction". An even higher risk is faced by critically endangered species, which meet the quantitative criteria for endangered species. Critically endangered insects are listed separately. There are 538 insect species which are endangered or critically endangered.

Additionally 1702 insect species (28% of those evaluated) are listed as data deficient, meaning there is insufficient information for a full assessment of conservation status. As these species typically have small distributions and/or populations, they are intrinsically likely to be threatened, according to the IUCN. While the category of data deficient indicates that no assessment of extinction risk has been made for the taxa, the IUCN notes that it may be appropriate to give them "the same degree of attention as threatened taxa, at least until their status can be assessed".

This is a complete list of endangered insect species and subspecies as evaluated by the IUCN.

Blattodea

Orthoptera
There are 91 species and two subspecies in the order Orthoptera assessed as endangered.

Lentulids

Tetrigids

Euschmidtiids

Mogoplistids

Pamphagids

Crickets

Species

Subspecies
Phaloria insularis insularis

Acridids

Tettigoniids

Phaneropterids

Species

Subspecies
Isophya longicaudata longicaudata

Hymenoptera

Lepidoptera
Lepidoptera comprises moths and butterflies. There are 51 species in the order Lepidoptera assessed as endangered.

Swallowtail butterflies

Lycaenids

Nymphalids

Other Lepidoptera species

Beetles
There are 72 beetle species assessed as endangered.

Dytiscids

Stag beetles

Geotrupids

Longhorn beetles

Scarabaeids

Other beetle species

Odonata
Odonata includes dragonflies and damselflies. There are 97 species and 19 subspecies in the order Odonata assessed as endangered.

Platystictids

Platycnemidids

Species

Subspecies

Megapodagrionids

Gomphids

Species

Subspecies

Calopterygids

Species

Subspecies
Matrona basilaris japonica

Coenagrionids

Species

Subspecies
Pseudagrion torridum hulae

Aeshnids

Species

Subspecies

Libellulids

Species

Subspecies

Other Odonata

Species

Subspecies

Other insect species

See also 
 Lists of IUCN Red List endangered species
 List of least concern insects
 List of near threatened insects
 List of vulnerable insects
 List of critically endangered insects
 List of recently extinct insects
 List of data deficient insects

References 

Insects
Endangered insects
Endangered insects
Endangered insects